Torazō Shimamoto (1914–1989) was a Japanese politician from Takashima, Hokkaido (now part of Otaru, Hokkaido). He was a member of the House of Representatives of Japan from Hokkaido 1st district.

References

Bibliography
『まぼろしの黄金律』-わたしの半生記 （全電通労働組合北海道本部政治局 1979年） ASIN B000J8EYRS
『島虎の町おこし奮戦記』（第一書林 1988年10月）

1914 births
1989 deaths
Mayors of places in Hokkaido
Politicians from Hokkaido
Social Democratic Party (Japan) politicians
Members of the House of Representatives (Japan)
People from Otaru